Bageswari may refer to:

Bageswari, Bangladesh
Bageswari, Nepal